HD 156846 is a binary star system in the equatorial constellation of Ophiuchus, positioned a degree SSE of Messier 9. It has a yellow hue and is just barely bright enough to be visible to the naked eye with an apparent visual magnitude of 6.5. The system is located at a distance of 156 light years from the Sun based on parallax. It is drifting closer with a radial velocity of −68.5 km/s, and is predicted to come to within  in about 476,000 years.

The primary, component A, is a G-type star with a stellar classification of G1V. The absolute visual magnitude of this star is 1.13 magnitudes above the main sequence, indicating it has evolved slightly off the main sequence. It has 1.35 times the mass of the Sun and 2.12 times the Sun's radius. The star is an estimated 2.8 billion years old and is spinning with a projected rotational velocity of 5 km/s. It is radiating five times the luminosity of the Sun from its photosphere at an effective temperature of 5,969 K.

The magnitude 14.4 secondary companion, component B, was discovered by the American astronomer R. G. Aitken in 1910. This is a red dwarf with a class of M4V and has an estimated 59% of the Sun's mass.

Planetary system 
On 26 October 2007, a planet HD 156846 b was found orbiting the primary star by Tamuz, using the radial velocity method. The estimated mass of this object is, at a minimum, 10.6 times the mass of Jupiter. If it were following the same orbit within the Solar System, it would have a perihelion within the orbit of Mercury and an aphelion outside the orbit of Mars.

See also 
 HD 4113
 List of extrasolar planets

References

G-type main-sequence stars
M-type main-sequence stars
Binary stars
Planetary systems with one confirmed planet
Ophiuchus (constellation)
Durchmusterung objects
156846
084856
6441